Julian Baas (born 16 April 2002) is a Dutch professional footballer who plays as a midfielder for Eredivisie club Excelsior.

Career
Baas made his professional debut in the Eerste Divisie appearing as a substitute as Excelsior played Jong PSV away on 29 August 2020 winning 6–1. 

Appearing as a substitute in the promotion play-off against ADO Den Haag on the 29 May 2022, Baas provided the assist in extra time with his club 4–3 down for Redouan El Yaakoubi to head in an equaliser and send the match to penalties. Baas took the second spot off kick for his side and scored his penalty as Excelsior triumphed on the day. Following their promotion from the Eerste Divisie at the end of the 2021–22 season, he made his Eredivisie debut for Excelsior on 12 August 2022 against SC Cambuur at the Cambuur Stadion in a 2–0 victory.

References

External links
 

Living people
2002 births
Excelsior Rotterdam players
Dutch footballers
Eredivisie players
Eerste Divisie players
Footballers from Dordrecht